The 2016 ICC World Cricket League Division Four was an international limited-overs cricket tournament held in Los Angeles from 29 October – 5 November 2016. It was the fifth edition of WCL Division Four, and the first World Cricket League tournament played in the United States. All matches were played at the Leo Magnus Cricket Complex.

The tournament was won by the United States, who defeated Oman in the final by 13 runs. Both the finalists were promoted to the 2017 Division Three tournament. The bottom two teams, Jersey and Italy, were relegated to Division Five. Jersey's Corey Bisson was the leading run-scorer, while Denmark's Aftab Ahmed and American pace bowler Timil Patel were the equal leading wicket-takers. Oman's Khawar Ali, an all-rounder, was named player of the tournament.

After the conclusion of the tournament, the United States captain Steven Taylor said that "this victory means a lot to us, especially as it came with the home crowd behind us". The United States coach Pubudu Dassanayake said "I wouldn't have settled for runner-up in the final" and that he was "very happy how things went in the final".

Teams

The following teams qualified:

 (5th in 2014 ICC World Cricket League Division Three)
 (6th in 2014 ICC World Cricket League Division Three)
 (3rd in 2014 ICC World Cricket League Division Four)
 (4th in 2014 ICC World Cricket League Division Four)
 (1st in 2016 ICC World Cricket League Division Five)
 (2nd in 2016 ICC World Cricket League Division Five)

Venue
 
All matches were played at Leo Magnus Cricket Complex in Van Nuys, Los Angeles.

Preparation
Bermuda prepared for the tournament by playing four exhibition games in Toronto against club teams and a High Performance XI. Canada traveled to Bermuda to play three 50 over matches. The United States held a five-day camp in Indianapolis between 17 and 21 September. This included two 50 over matches against a Marylebone Cricket Club side. The United States also played Canada in the Auty Cup on 13, 14 and 16 October 2016 in Los Angeles.

Squads

 Srini Santhanam was originally named in the U.S. squad, but was replaced by Ravi Timbawala after suffering a pre-tournament injury.
 Terryn Fray was originally named in Bermuda's squad, but was replaced by Janeiro Tucker after breaking a finger in a warm-up match.
 Denmark's captain Michael Pedersen left the tournament on 1 November to attend to a family emergency, with Amjad Khan standing in as captain in his absence.
 Due to several members of the squad suffering injuries during the tournament, Tony Carlyon, Jersey's 46-year-old team manager, was called into the team for the final match of the tournament.

Round-robin

Points table

Fixtures
All times are given in Pacific Daylight Time (PDT).

Playoffs

Fifth-place playoff

Third-place playoff

First-place playoff

Statistics

Most runs
The top five run-scorers are included in this table, ranked by runs scored and then by batting average.

Source: ESPNcricinfo

Most wickets

The top five wicket-takers are listed in this table, ranked by wickets taken and then by bowling average.

Source: ESPNcricinfo

References

External links
 Series home at ESPN Cricinfo

2016, 4
International cricket competitions in 2016–17
2016 in Los Angeles
2016 in sports in California
International cricket competitions in the United States
2016 in American sports
Cricket in Los Angeles